Daniel Sheehan may refer to:

 D. D. Sheehan (Daniel Desmond Sheehan, 1873–1948), Irish nationalist and author
 Daniel E. Sheehan (1917–2000), American Roman Catholic prelate, archbishop of Omaha
 Daniel Joseph Sheehan (1894–1917), son of D. D. Sheehan, Irish aviator
 Daniel Sheehan (attorney), co-founder of the Christic Institute
 Dan Sheehan (rugby union) (born 1998), Irish rugby union player

See also
 Dan Sheahan, American baseball player